Terra Bella is a census-designated place (CDP) in Tulare County, California, United States.  The population was 3,310 at the 2010 census, down from 3,466 at the 2000 census.

Geography
Terra Bella is located at  (35.961292, -119.040914).

The community is served by the Terra Bella Irrigation District.

Demographics

2010
The 2010 United States Census reported that Terra Bella had a population of 3,310. The racial makeup of Terra Bella was 1,426 (43.1%) White, 5 (0.2%) African American, 20 (0.6%) Native American, 75 (2.3%) Asian, 2 (0.1%) Pacific Islander, 1,733 (52.4%) from other races, and 49 (1.5%) from two or more races. Hispanic or Latino of any race were 2,894 persons (87.4%).

The Census reported that 3,301 people (99.7% of the population) lived in households, 9 (0.3%) lived in non-institutionalized group quarters, and 0 (0%) were institutionalized.

There were 787 households, out of which 510 (64.8%) had children under the age of 18 living in them, 521 (66.2%) were opposite-sex married couples living together, 93 (11.8%) had a female householder with no husband present, 78 (9.9%) had a male householder with no wife present.  There were 73 (9.3%) unmarried opposite-sex partnerships, and 10 (1.3%) same-sex married couples or partnerships. 65 households (8.3%) were made up of individuals, and 25 (3.2%) had someone living alone who was 65 years of age or older. The average household size was 4.19.  There were 692 families (87.9% of all households); the average family size was 4.41.

The population was spread out, with 1,256 people (37.9%) under the age of 18, 344 people (10.4%) aged 18 to 24, 926 people (28.0%) aged 25 to 44, 564 people (17.0%) aged 45 to 64, and 220 people (6.6%) who were 65 years of age or older.  The median age was 26.1 years. For every 100 females, there were 104.6 males.  For every 100 females age 18 and over, there were 105.8 males.

The homeowner vacancy rate was 1.0%; the rental vacancy rate was 3.8%.  1,627 people (49.2% of the population) lived in owner-occupied housing units and 1,674 people (50.6%) lived in rental housing units.

2000
As of the census of 2000, there were 3,466 people, 779 households, and 701 families residing in the CDP. The racial makeup of the CDP was 28.85% White, 0.55% African American, 1.64% Native American, 3.58% Asian, 61.17% from other races, and 4.21% from two or more races. Hispanic or Latino of any race were 83.96% of the population.

There were 779 households, out of which 60.7% had children under the age of 18 living with them, 71.4% were married couples living together, 11.6% had a female householder with no husband present, and 10.0% were non-families. 8.1% of all households were made up of individuals, and 4.0% had someone living alone who was 65 years of age or older.  The average household size was 4.44 and the average family size was 4.60.

In the CDP, the population was spread out, with 38.0% under the age of 18, 14.2% from 18 to 24, 27.6% from 25 to 44, 14.8% from 45 to 64, and 5.4% who were 65 years of age or older.  The median age was 24 years. For every 100 females, there were 118.3 males.  For every 100 females age 18 and over, there were 117.0 males.

The median income for a household in the CDP was $25,313, and the median income for a family was $24,750. Males had a median income of $20,469 versus $17,188 for females. The per capita income for the CDP was $7,034.  About 34.7% of families and 39.6% of the population were below the poverty line, including 48.6% of those under age 18 and 20.0% of those age 65 or over.

Politics
In the state legislature Terra Bella is located in the 16th Senate District, represented by Democrat Dean Florez, and in the 30th Assembly District, represented by Republican Danny Gilmore.

In the United States House of Representatives, Terra Bella is in

References

Census-designated places in Tulare County, California
Census-designated places in California